The Canton of Anse-Bertrand is a former canton in the Arrondissement of Pointe-à-Pitre on the island of Guadeloupe. It had 10,691 inhabitants (2012). It was disbanded following the French canton reorganisation which came into effect in March 2015. It consisted of 2 communes, which joined the canton of Petit-Canal in 2015.

Municipalities
The canton comprised 2 communes:
Anse-Bertrand
Port-Louis

See also
Cantons of Guadeloupe
Communes of Guadeloupe
Arrondissements of Guadeloupe

References

Former cantons of Guadeloupe
2015 disestablishments in France
States and territories disestablished in 2015